Excellence was a Swedish pop girl group from 2001 created through the TV programme Popstars on Kanal 5.  The group scored a number one album on the Swedish Charts, as well as five top 10 singles, and entered Melodifestivalen 2002. They also collaborated with Markoolio on the official Swedish song for the 2002 Winter Olympics "Vi ska vinna!" Their last single was ‘We can dance’ which reached top 10 on the charts. The group split shortly after the single was released. Member Ana Johnsson later scored a worldwide solo hit with the song "We Are" from the Spider-Man 2 soundtrack and has since then (October 2006) released her second album Little Angel.

Discography

Album

Singles

References

Popstars winners
Swedish girl groups
Swedish Eurodance groups
Swedish pop music groups
Swedish dance music groups
Musical groups established in 2001
Musical groups disestablished in 2002
Melodifestivalen contestants of 2002